Shen Yiqin (born 15 December 1959) is a Chinese politician of Bai ethnic heritage. She is currently a state councilor and previously served as the Communist Party Secretary of Guizhou, a province in southwestern China, between November 2020 and December 2022. 

Shen is the third female provincial-level party chief since the founding of the People's Republic of China in 1949 after Wan Shaofen and former Vice Premier Sun Chunlan.

Career
Shen was born in Zhijin County, Guizhou. Shen belonged to a group of sent-down youth in the latter years of the Cultural Revolution. After the Cultural Revolution ended, she began studying history at Guizhou University. After graduating, she was sent to work for the provincial party school in Guizhou as a lecturer. She later became a human resources manager there. In 1998, she became vice president of the Guizhou party school. In 1999 she became Vice Chair of the Guizhou Social Sciences Academic Association.

In December 2001, Shen became deputy party chief of Qiannan Buyei and Miao Autonomous Prefecture, then deputy party chief and head commissioner (mayor) of Tongren. In April 2007, Shen became a member of the provincial Party Standing Committee of Guizhou and head of the provincial party propaganda department.  In May 2012, she was named Executive Vice Governor of Guizhou. In April 2015 she became Deputy Party Secretary of Guizhou and Secretary of Political and Legal Affairs Commission (Zhengfawei) of Guizhou. At the time of her appointment to the deputy party chief position, she became the second sitting female zhuanzhi deputy party secretary in the country, and the only female provincial Zhengfawei chief in the country.

In September 2017, Shen was appointed as the acting Governor of Guizhou. Shen Yiqin is the first female Governor of Guizhou, the first Governor of Bai ethnic heritage, and the first Governor to have been born in province since 1993.

In November 2020, Shen was appointed as the CCP Secretary of Guizhou.

Shen was an alternate member of the 17th and the 18th Central Committees of the Chinese Communist Party, and is a full member of the 19th Central Committee.

References 

Guizhou University alumni
1959 births
Living people
Governors of Guizhou
People from Bijie
Bai people
Alternate members of the 17th Central Committee of the Chinese Communist Party
Alternate members of the 18th Central Committee of the Chinese Communist Party
Members of the 19th Central Committee of the Chinese Communist Party
Members of the 20th Central Committee of the Chinese Communist Party
21st-century Chinese women politicians
21st-century Chinese politicians